A wide range of garden types exist. Below is a list of examples.

By country of origin 
  

 
Chinese garden
Cantonese garden
Sichuanese garden
Dutch garden
Egyptian garden
English garden
English landscape garden
French garden
French formal garden
French landscape garden
Gardens of the French Renaissance
German garden
Greek garden
Italian garden
Italian Renaissance garden

Japanese garden
Japanese dry garden
Japanese tea garden
Tsubo-niwa
Korean garden

Persian garden
Charbagh
Paradise garden

Spanish garden
Andalusian Patio
United States garden
Colonial Revival garden

By historical empire
Byzantine gardens
Mughal gardens
Persian gardens
Roman gardens

In religion
Bahá'í gardens
Biblical garden
Islamic garden
Mary garden
Sacred garden

Other 
Aquascaping
Back garden
Baroque garden
Bog garden
Bosquet
Botanical gardens
Alpine
Arboretum
Palmetum
Bottle garden
Butterfly gardening
Cactus garden
Charbagh
Color garden
Community garden
Allotment (gardening)
Communal garden
Garden sharing
Container garden
Cottage garden
Energy-efficient landscaping
Ferme ornée
Fernery
Flower box
Flower garden
Forest gardening
Front garden
Garden room
Garden square
Hanging garden (cultivation)
Herb gardens
Hòn Non Bộ
Hortus conclusus
Intercultural Garden
Keyhole garden
Kitchen garden
Knot garden
Maze
Hedge maze
Turf maze
Memorial garden
Monastic garden
Moon garden
Moss garden
Orangery
Organic horticulture
Pattern gardening
Permaculture
Physic garden
Playscape
Paradise garden
Pleasure garden
Pollinator garden
Rain garden
Raised bed gardening
Road verge
Rock garden
Rocket garden
Roof garden
Green roof
Subtropical climate vegetated roof
Rose garden
School garden
Sculpture garden
Sculpture trail
Sensory garden
Shade garden
Shakespeare garden
Stumpery
Sustainable gardening
Tea garden
Telegarden
Therapeutic garden
Terrace garden
Trial garden
Tropical garden
Tropical horticulture
Underground farming
Upside-down gardening
Urban horticulture
Vertical garden
Victory garden
Walled garden
Water garden
Wildlife garden
Window box
Winter garden
Woodland garden
Xeriscaping
Zen garden

See also

History of gardening
Landscape design
:Category:Garden features
:Category:Types of garden

External links
Historic garden types

 
Gardening lists
Design-related lists
Types
Garden design history